Film Noir is the 17th studio album by American singer-songwriter Carly Simon, released by Arista Records, on September 16, 1997.

It is Simon's third album devoted to standards, following Torch (1981) and My Romance (1990). Jimmy Webb co-produced the album and contributed his vocals, orchestration and piano skills to the project which was filmed for an AMC documentary entitled Songs in Shadow: The Making of Carly Simon's Film Noir (which premiered in September 1997). He also co-wrote the title song "Film Noir" with Simon. John Travolta duets with Simon on the song "Two Sleepy People". Film director Martin Scorsese provided liner notes in the fold out booklet. The album was nominated for the Grammy Award for Best Traditional Pop Vocal Performance in 1998.

Promotion and reception

Songs in Shadow: The Making of Carly Simon's Film Noir aired as a special presentation on AMC. This documentary also features footage of Jimmy Webb, Arif Mardin and Van Dyke Parks in the studio recording the album with Simon. Simon made and released a music video for "Ev'ry Time We Say Goodbye". She also performed the song on The Tonight Show with Jay Leno and The Late Show with David Letterman. In addition to appearances on The View and CBS This Morning, she performed "Spring Will Be a Little Late This Year" with Jimmy Webb on The Rosie O'Donnell Show.

AllMusic rated the album 3 out of 5 stars and wrote "Using smoky saloon songs like "Ev'ry Time We Say Goodbye" as a blueprint, Simon and producer Jimmy Webb create a seductive, intimate atmosphere."

Awards

Track listing
Credits adapted from the album's liner notes.

Personnel

Musicians

Production

Charts
Album – Billboard (United States)

References

External links
 Carly Simon's Official Website

1997 albums
Arista Records albums
Carly Simon albums
Albums arranged by Jimmy Webb
Albums produced by Jimmy Webb
Albums produced by Arif Mardin
Traditional pop albums